Rupert Gavin (born 1 October 1954) is a British entrepreneur, businessman, and theatre impresario.

Formerly CEO of BBC Worldwide and Odeon Cinemas as a producer/financier. He has produced/coproduced a series of plays and musicals through his company, Incidental Colman.

Gavin serves as Chairman of Historic Royal Palaces and HMG Honours Committee for Arts and Media.

Current roles 
In 2015 Gavin was appointed chairman of Historic Royal Palaces, the charity responsible for the management and conservation of the Tower of London, Kensington Palace, Hampton Court Palace, Banqueting House, Kew Palace, and Hillsborough Castle. His tenure was extended for a second term in May 2018.

He is executive chairman of the theatre production company Incidental Colman, which has produced/co-produced in the West End and on Broadway and won seventeen Olivier Awards.

He is also Chairman of the HMG Honours Committee for Media and the Arts and commenced his second term as of January 2019. He is a Senior Assistant of the Court of the Worshipful Company of Grocers, having served as Master for 2017/18. He is serving as the Chairman of the Living Room Cinema, the new start-up cinema chain. Gavin is a director of the West End industry body, SOLT.

Early career
Gavin was educated at Magdalene College at the Cambridge University, where he had an exhibition in economics. After graduation, and a stint as a film script writer, he took a copywriting role at Sharps advertising agency where he would eventually become an equity partner before it was sold to Saatchi & Saatchi. While working at Sharps he established close links with Dixons Stores Group, and would eventually become deputy managing director of the electronics retailer. In 1994, he joined British Telecom to work on its internet and multimedia strategy; he became managing director of the firm's consumer division. In 1998, he became chief executive of BBC Worldwide. He was CEO of Odeon Cinemas and UCI Cinemas Group from 2006 to 2014

Gavin has also served as Board member and shareholder of Ambassador Theatre Group, Chairman of DNeg plc, Chairman of Contender Entertainment Group, Chairman of Screenstage, NED and audit Chair of Wyevale Garden Centres, NED of Countrywide plc and Virgin Mobile plc, Governor of the National Film and Television School and Treasurer of the Contemporary Art Society.

Recent theatre productions, co-productions and financings
 Mojo
 The Ferryman
 The Book of Mormon
 Jersey Boys
 West Side Story (50th-anniversary revival)
 Brainiac
 Shockheaded Peter
 Othello with Lenny Henry
 A View from the Bridge with Ken Stott
 Ghosts with Lesley Manville
 Long Days Journey into Night with David Suchet
 All My Sons with David Suchet
 Death of a Salesman with Philip Seymour Hoffman and Andrew Garfield
 South Pacific
 Legally Blonde
 The Sunshine Boys with Danny DeVito
 Jerusalem with Mark Rylance
 Twelfth Night and Richard III with Mark Rylance
 Farinelli and the King with Mark Rylance
 Private Lives with Kim Cattrall
 Clybourne Park
 The Birthday Party with Toby Jones, Zoë Wanamaker and Stephen Mangan
 Old Times with Kristin Scott Thomas
 Betrayal with Kristin Scott Thomas
 Electra with Kristin Scott Thomas
 Three Sisters 
 King Charles III with Tim Pigott-Smith
 1984
 King Lear with Ian McKellen
 Hamlet with Benedict Cumberbatch
 Hamlet with Andrew Scott
 Gypsy with Imelda Staunton
 Sunny Afternoon
 The River with Hugh Jackman
 Dreamgirls
 The Jungle
 Consent
 Who's Afraid of Virginia Woolf? with Imelda Staunton
 Tina Turner – The Musical
 The Inheritance
 All About Eve with Gillian Anderson and Lily James
 The King and I
 Caroline, or Change with Sharon D. Clarke
 Uncle Vanya with Toby Jones
 Leopoldstadt by Sir Tom Stoppard
 Betrayal with Tom Hiddleston
 Cyrano de Bergerac with James McAvoy
 All of the dramatic works of Arthur Smith since 1980
 Pretty Woman (London)
 The Rocky Horror Show
 Anything Goes
 Cabaret, with Eddie Redmayne and Jessie Buckley
 Constellations

In 2012 the Evening Standard newspaper dubbed Gavin "Mr West End" about London's Theatreland. Productions/co-productions by Incidental Colman have won seventeen Olivier awards, for either Best New Play, Best Play Revival, Best New Musical, Best Musical Revival or Best Entertainment.

Personal life
Gavin married Ellen Miller in 1991; the couple has two daughters, Alexandra and Isabella, and live in London. Debrett's lists his leisure activities as "...theatre producer, lyricist and gardener". He is a Fellow of the Royal Television Society.

Charitable activities
Gavin is Chairman of the charity Historic Royal Palaces.

He has been a lifelong contributor to the Grocers' Charity, which supports a range of small charities. He currently sits on the Education and Charities Committee of the Grocers' Company. He is a Patron of the Hay Literary Festival, the London Library, and the Purbeck International Chamber Music Festival. He sits on the Development Council of the Almeida Theatre.

Ancestry
He is of direct descent from James Gavin (b 1658), the Kirk Beadle of Lunan, Angus, and the family motto is By industry we prosper.

References

External links 
 Historic Royal Palaces
 Incidental Colman
 Terra Firma biography

1954 births
Living people
People educated at Eton College
Alumni of Magdalene College, Cambridge
British advertising executives
BBC people
English theatre managers and producers
British chief executives
British Telecom people
Livery companies